The 1933–34 Serie A season was won by Juventus.

Teams
Livorno and Brescia had been promoted from Serie B.

Events
A temporary relegation spot was added to reduce the league.

Final classification

Results

Top goalscorers

References and sources
Almanacco Illustrato del Calcio – La Storia 1898–2004, Panini Edizioni, Modena, September 2005

External links
 Italy 1933/34 – All results on RSSSF Website.

Serie A seasons
Italy
1933–34 in Italian football leagues